Agullo is a surname. People with this surname include:

 Francisco Agullo (died 1648), a Spanish painter
 Thierry Agullo, one of the early participants on the Sociological art movement

See also
 Guillem Agulló i Salvador, a Valencian member of the independentist political organization Maulets
 Horacio Agulla, an Argentine rugby union player.